This is a list of programs currently and formerly broadcast by Canadian television channel History and its former incarnation as History Television. This list is current as of September 2014.

Current programming

Acquired from History
 Alone
 American Pickers
 American Restoration
 Biker Battleground Phoenix
 Counting Cars
 The Hunt
 Ice Road Truckers
 Mountain Men
 Pawn Stars
 Pawnography
 Swamp People
 Texas Rising

Other programming
 Airport: Below Zero
 Auction House
 Black Watch
 BLK, An Origin Story
 Canadian Pickers
 Hardcore Heroes
 History Erased
 Ice Pilots NWT
 Knightfall
 Museum Secrets
 Nazi Treasure Hunters
 Restoration Garage
 Six
 Treasures Decoded
 Vikings
Yukon Gold

Former programming

0–9
 10 Days That Unexpectedly Changed America
 12 O'Clock High
 1916 Total War
 21st Century War Machines

A
 Aftermath
 Airwars: Fire in the Skies
 America: The Story of the U.S.
 Ancestors In The Attic
 Ancient Aliens
 Ancient Discoveries
 Ancient Weather
 Ancients Behaving Badly
 Anna Leonowens Getting to Know You
 Antiques Roadshow (US)
 Antiques Roadshow FYI (US)
 Around the World in 80 Ways
 Auschwitz: The Forgotten Evidence
 Ax Men

B
 Band of Brothers
 Barbarians
 Barbarians Rising
 Battle 360°
 Battle of Britain
 Battle of Hood and Bismarck
 The Battle of Jutland
 Battlefield Britain
 Battlefield Detectives
 Battleships
 Beast Legends
 Betrayal
 Beyond the Da Vinci Code
 Big Timber
 Blowdown
 Bomb Hunters
 The Bomber's Dream
 The Bombing War
 Brad Meltzer's Decoded
 Breathing Fire: Battle of the Somme
 Britain AD: King Arthur's Britain

C
 Canadian Made
 The Canadians
 Carnivàle
 The Charge of the Light Brigade
 Chasing Mummies: The Amazing Adventures of Zahi Hawass
 China Beach
 Churchill: Man of Destiny
 Cities of the Underworld
 Conquest
 Convoy: War of the Atlantic
 Crime Stories

D
 D-Day: Men and Machines
 D-Day to Victory
 Dambusters Fly Again
 Deadly Arts
 Deadwood
 Death in the Bunker
 Deep Wreck Mysteries
 Devil's Brigade
 Diana: The Night She Died
 Diana's Legacy
 Dispatches from the Front
 Dive Detectives
 Dogfight: Mystery of the Red Baron
 Down East Dickering
 Dual Suspects
 Dust Up

E
 The Egyptian Job
 Einstein
 Enchanted Summers
 The English Club
 Exhibit A

F
 Finding the Fallen
 Foyle's War

G
 Ghost Towns
 Great Canadian Lakes
 The Great Stink
 The Greatest Escapes of History
 Greatest Tank Battles

H
 Hairy Bikers
 Halifax: The Story of a Bomber
 History Bites
 History Lands
 History's Secrets
 Hitler of the Andes
 Hitler's Britain
 Hitler's Sunken Secret
 Hitler's War on America
 Hitler's Women
 Horizon: King Solomon's Tablet

I
 Ice Road Truckers: Deadliest Roads
 In Korea
 Inside Lost Worlds
 Inside the Mafia

J
 JAG
 Japan's Atomic Bomb
 Japan's War in Colour

K
 The Kennedys

L
 The Last Dawn
 Life After People
 Lost Battlefields
 The Lost Book of Nostradamus
 Lost Inventions
 Lost Worlds

M
 MacArthur
 March of the Dinosaurs
 M*A*S*H
 Masterminds
 Moby Dick: The True Story
 MysteryQuest

N
 Nazi Hunters
 The Nostradamus Effect

O
 Outlaw Bikers

P
 The Pacific
 Patton 360
 Pawnathon Canada
 Power & Ice

R
 The Re-Inventors
 Rodeo: Life on the Circuit

S
 Secret War Files: The Battle of the Mace
 Storming Juno
 Storm Planets

T
 Tank Overhaul
 They Built the Railway
 Timeline: Century of Conflict
 TimeChase
 Top Gear USA
 A Town in Africa
 Trashopolis
 A Treasure Ship Tragedy
 True Crime Scene
 Turning Points in History

U
 Underworld Histories
 Urban Legends

V
 Vietnam in HD
 Vikings

W
 Waterlife
 What's in a Name?
 William Shatner's Weird or What?
 World War II in HD
 World War II in HD: The Air War

References
 https://web.archive.org/web/20070707002727/http://www.history.ca/shows/default.aspx

Notes

External links
 History Television
 History Channel
 Military History Channel
 History Channel UK
 History Channel Australia
 History Channel Asia
 Shaw Television

History Television
 
Canadian television-related lists